The Red Countess is a 1985 Hungarian drama film directed by András Kovács. It was entered into the 14th Moscow International Film Festival.

Cast
 Juli Básti as Katus, gróf Károlyi Mihályné, Andrássy Katinka
 Ferenc Bács as Gróf Károlyi Mihály
 Ferenc Kállai as Gróf Andrássy Gyula
 Hédi Temessy as Gróf Andrássy Gyuláné
 Klári Tolnay as Geraldin, Károlyi's foster mother
 Ildikó Molnár as Kája, Katus' sister
 Gábor Reviczky as Pallavichini György
 András Bálint as Jászi Oszkár
 Géza Tordy as Tisza István
 Teri Tordai as Madeleine, Károlyi's lover
 László Tahi Tóth as Kéry Pál

References

External links
 

1985 films
1985 drama films
Hungarian drama films
1980s Hungarian-language films
Films directed by András Kovács